Michael Quinlan may refer to:

 Sir Michael Quinlan (civil servant) (1930–2009), former top official in the British Ministry of Defence
 Michael Quinlan (musician), musician with The Mexican Spitfires
 Michael R. Quinlan (born 1944), former McDonald's CEO
 Michael Quinlan, staff member of the Louisville Courier-Journal and author of the book Little Lost Angel, about the murder of Shanda Sharer